A Compassionate Spy is a 2022 American documentary film written and directed by Steve James. It premiered out of competition at the 79th edition of the Venice Film Festival.

Plot
Through a long interview with the subject and his wife, archive footage and some dramatic reenactments, the film tells the story of Manhattan Project physicist and Soviet Union spy Theodore Hall.

Release
The film had its world premiere at the premiered out of competition at the 79th Venice International Film Festival. It was later screened at various festivals including the Telluride Film Festival, the Chicago International Film Festival, and the Palm Springs International Film Festival.

Reception
On Rotten Tomatoes, the film has a 100% approval rating based on 10 reviews. In spite of its mostly positive reception, the reenactments were criticized, described as "unnecessary", making the film "more televisual than in James’s best work", and as "a miscalculation that keeps (the film) at arm’s length."

References

External links
 
 

2022 documentary films  
American documentary films